Edmundston Airport  is located  northwest of Edmundston, New Brunswick, Canada along the east bank of the Madawaska River.

The airport is unique among Canadian airports in that its runway straddles the interprovincial border between New Brunswick and Quebec and is located in Patrieville, New Brunswick in Madawaska County and Dégelis, Quebec in the Témiscouata Regional County Municipality.

The airport is classified as an airport of entry by Nav Canada and is staffed by the Canada Border Services Agency (CBSA). CBSA officers at this airport can handle general aviation aircraft only, with no more than 15 passengers.

The airport featured a World War II-era Lancaster KB882 on display outside the terminal building since 1964. The aircraft was relocated in 2017, to the National Air Force Museum of Canada.

References

Registered aerodromes in New Brunswick
Buildings and structures in Edmundston
Transport in Edmundston